Jutta Frieda Luise Meischner (born 1935, in Danzig) is a German archeologist with specialities in philology, classical archaeology, ancient history with a doctorate on Classical Archaeology. In 1964, she entered the service of German Archaeological Institute, Berlin.

Biography

The daughter of the civil engineer Herbert Meischner and his wife Lilly, she was born in 1935 in what was then the Free City of Danzig. After fleeing Danzig in January 1945 in the wake of World War II, she attended the Droste-Hülshoff High School in Berlin-Zehlendorf, where she passed her A-levels  in 1954. At the Free University of Berlin, she studied classical philology, classical archeology, ancient history and completed studies of Greek and Latin. She spent the academic year 1958/59 at the University of Athens and Greece. The next year was dedicated to the study of Greek and Roman ancient collections of the major museums in order to prepare her dissertation on "The Female Portrait in the Severan Period". Her academic advisor, Friedrich Wilhelm Goethert, was instrumental in getting her a post as an assistant with Friedrich Matz, the Younger, in Sarkophag-Corpus, Marburg, as well as in assisting with her first publication "A second type of portrait of the Empress Crispina". After completing her doctorate in 1964, she joined the civil service at the German Archaeological Institute, Berlin, from which she retired after 35 years of service in 2000. During this time she also continued her studies of late antique portraiture, which culminated in a brief monograph entitled "Portraits of Late Antiquity" (bnb-Verlag Bremen, 2001). A revised and expanded edition in German and English is currently being prepared.

In 1988 she was invited by the Archaeological Institute in Warsaw for a lecture and a visit to Danzig. In 1998, she lectured in Mérida on the great Missorium of Theodosius I where she credited it to Theodosius II. She toured the great museums in the U.S. several times. Tunisian mosaics inspired her to study the Greek and Roman sports. The origin of the palm award, for example, can be seen in the wand of the paidotribe in the palaestra. The wands were switches and palm fronds. The latter then served as an unofficial trophy. The black-figure and red-figure vases evidence this practice. In the great Panhellenic Games of the prize remained the wreath. The palm trophy in the imperial period was abstracted to the shape of a golden palm trunk, the so-called 'Preiszylinder' for successful racehorses. With the New Testament Pauline epistles the symbol of the victor's palm keeps its validity even today.

Jutta Meischner was given responsibility for the publication of the wall paintings of the Late Roman Hypogeum in Constanta, Romania. In Copenhagen, she was able to assign the, up to then, much earlier dated statues of Sette Sale to the Valentinian epoch, based on the design of the eyes. In 1999 she received permission to study and publicize Greek and Roman sculptures from the Hatay Archaeology Museum in Antakya, Turkey. Through the Attic garland sarcophagi was shown the Attic origin of Berlin's early imperial Caffarelli-sarcophagus from Rome. Together with Ergün Laflı from Izmir she again showed her commitment to southern Turkey with the presentation of antique sculptures in Cilicia. Related materials found on a trip to Israel in the Rockefeller Museum, Jerusalem, were added to the above publication.

During 2005-2008, she conducted extensive research on Late archaic sculpture, that resulted in pinning down subtle but highly important and meaningful distinctive features in the transitional period of late Archaic and early Classical sculpture. A detailed study of a black marble head (whose typological affinity on the basis of two relatively well preserved surviving coins, one in the Bibliothèque nationale, Paris, and the other in the Berlin Münz-Cabinet) points to the Apollo Philesios by Canachus in Didyma, dating from the early 5th Century BC. This study will be of major import for identifying the above major features in rendering the physiognomic, facial and portrayal details. These appear to have been largely overlooked in previous field research and studies on the art of Greek sculpture and the sudden stylistic change from the late Archaic and Severe periods to early the Classical.

She is now on the advisory board of Adem's Clay, a design firm in Berlin.

Published works

61:
Meischner, J. und Laflı E.
Eine frühklassische Stele aus Samsun/Amisos. In: Istanbuler Mitteilungen, 65, Ernst Wasmuth Verlag, Tübingen, 2015, 63-81. 

60:
Meischner, J. und Laflı E.
Der Fischer am Meer. Römische Brunnenlandschaften. In: Il Mar Nero 8, 2010/2011, 231-238. Edizioni Quasar, Rom 2013. , 

59:
Meischner, J.
Das Spitzbauchknäblein aus Elaiussa Sebasté, Kilikien, Études et Travaux 25, Edition Wydawnictwo Neriton, Warschau 2012, 254-259. 

56:
Meischner, J.
[Rez. zu]: K. Fittschen, P. Zanker, P. Cain, Katalog der römischen Porträts in den Capitolinischen Museen. In: Janka, Luther, Schmitzer (Hrsg.): Gymnasium 2012, Band 119, Heft 2, 205-207. Universitätsverlag Winter, Heidelberg. 

55:
Meischner, J.
Spätantike Skulpturen im östlichen Mittelmeerraum, Jahreshefte des Österreichischen Archäologischen Instituts in Wien 179, 2010, 179-204. , 

54b:
Meischner. J.
Die attische Girlande und der Sarkophag Caffarelli. In: Babesch 83-2008, Stichting Bulletin Antieke Beschaving, Verlag Orientaliste Leuven, 2008. 

54:
Meischner, J.
Zur Datierung der Götterstatuen vom Esquilin, Amicitiae Gratia, Athen 2008,197-202. , 

53:
Meischner, J.
Antiochos V. und Anbtiochos VI. Legitimationshilfen an Bildnissen von Kinderkönigen, Collection de L'École Française de Rome 390, 2007.

52:
Meischner, J.
Hellenistische und römische Grabstelen im Archäologischen Museum von Hatay in Antakya, Jahreshefte des Österreichischen Archäologischen Instituts in Wien 77, 2008, 145-183. , 

51:
Meischner, J.
Spätantike Wandmalerei im unteren Donauraum, Il Mar Nero, Edizioni Quasar di Severino Tognon s.r.l., Roma 2001-2003,  113-141. 

50:
Meischner, J.
Ein Porträt der Kaiserin Justina im Vatikan. In: Hommages à Carl Deroux. Éditions Latomus, Bruxelles 2003, 200-202. 

49:
Meischner, J.
Eine spätantike Idealstatue in Villa Medici, Anadolu'da Dogdu: Festschrift Fahrı Isik,  Ege Yaginlari Istanbul 2004, 493-497 Abb.. 

48:
Meischner, J.
Zwei Porträttypen Kaiser Diokletians, in: The Roman and Late Roman City, Prof. Marin Drinov Academic Publishing House, Sofia 2002, 356-360. 

47:
Meischner, J.
El Missorium de Teodosio : una nueva interpretacion, in: El Disco de Teodosio, Real Academia de la Historia, Madrid 2000, 233-252, Abb. 

46:
Meischner, Jutta, 1935.
Späte Archaik und früher Strenger Stil : der Apollon Philesios des Kanachos Typus I und II = Late Archaic and early Severe Style : the Apollon Philesios by Kanachos Type I and II (2009), .  Publisher: edition bnb

44:
Meischner, J.
Eine spätantike Porträtbüste im Louvre, Patronus: Festschrift für Coskun Özgünel zum 65. Geburtstag, Homerbooks Istanbul 2007, 259-263. , 

43:
Meischner, J.
[Rez. zu]: K. Schade: Frauen in der Spätantike - Status und Repräsentation. Eine Untersuchung zur römischen und frühbyzantinischen Bildniskunst. In: Gnomon 77/2005, Verlag C.H. Beck, München 2005, 350ff.

42:
Meischner, J.
Die Skulpturen des Hatay Museums von Antakya, Jahrbuch des Deutschen Archäologischen Museums, Band 118, 2003, 285-384. Verlag Walter de Gruyter, Berlin.

41:
Meischner, J.
[Rez. zu]: M. Bergmann: Chiragan, Aphrodisias, Konstantinopel. Zur mythologischen Skulptur der Spätantike. In: Klein, Schmitzer (Hrsg.): Gymnasium Band 110, 2003, 402-403. Universitätsverlag Winter, Heidelberg.

40:
Meischner, J.  Cussini, Eleonora.
Vier palmyrenische Grabreliefs im Museum von Antakya. In: Jahrbuch des Archäologischen Instituts 2003, Verlag Philipp von Zabern, Mainz 2004, 97-105. , 

39:
Meischner, J.
[Rez. zu]: Jutta Rumscheid: Kranz und Krone. Zu Insignien, Siegespreisen und Ehrenzeichen der römischen Kaiserzeit. In: Klein, Schmitzer (Hrsg.): Gnomon 2002,  617-620. Verlag C.H. Beck, München.

38:
Meischner, J.
Ein Porträt Antiochos' VI. Epiphanes Dionysos in Mersin. In: Istanbuler Mitteilungen Band 51/2001,  Ernst Wasmuth Verlag, Tübingen 2001, 273-278.  , 

37:
Meischner, J.
Bildnisse der Spätantike 193-500: Problemfelder; die Privatporträts, Berlin 2001, edition.bnb. .

36b:
Meischner, J.
Der letzte Kaiser. Zum Porträt der nachtheodosianischen Epoche bis 500 n. Chr. S. 45ff. In: Jan Bouzek, Iva Ondrejova (Hrsg.): Roman Portraits. Artistic and Literary, Verlag Philipp von Zabern, Mainz 1997. 

36:
Meischner, J.
Das Missorium des Theodosius in Madrid. In: Jahrbuch des Deutschen Archäologischen Instituts, Band 111, 1996,  389-432, Abb. Verlag Walter de Gruyter, Berlin.
, 

35:
Meischner, J.
[Rez. zu]: S. Schröder, Katalog der antiken Skulpturen des Museo del Prado in Madrid, 1. Die Porträts, Bonner Jahrbücher 1995,  Rheinland-Verlag, Köln 1995, 720-722. 

34:
Meischner, J.
Bildtradition antiker Wettkampfrequisiten, In: Jahrbuch des Deutschen Archäologischen Instituts 1995, Band 110, S. 447–466, Abb. Verlag Walter de Gruyter, Berlin.
, 

33:
Meischner, J.
Bemerkungen zu einigen Kaiserporträts des 3. Jahrhunderts n.Chr. Philippus Arabs, Aurelian, Diokletian. In: Archäologischer Anzeiger 1995, 375-387 Abb. Verlag Walter de Gruyter, Berlin. 

32:
Meischner, J.
Studien zur spätantiken Kaiserikonographie. In: Jahrbuch des Deutschen Archäologischen Instituts 1995, Band 110, S. 431–446, Abb. Verlag Walter de Gruyter, Berlin.
, 

31:
Meischner, J.
Zum Porträt der "Poppäa Albani" In: Carl Deroux (Hrsg.): Latomus, 1993, 399-406, Taf.

30:
Meischner, J.
Familie Valentinian gratuliert. In: Istanbuler Mitteilungen 1993, 463-466, Taf. Verlag Ernst Wasmuth GmbH, Tübingen 1994. , 

29:
Meischner, J.
Der Hochzeitskameo des Honorius. In: Archäologischer Anzeiger 1993, 613-619, Abb. Verlag Walter de Gruyter, Berlin. 

28:
Meischner, J.
Das Porträt der valentinianischen Epoche. In: Jahrbuch des Deutschen Archäologischen Instituts, Band 107, 1992, 217-234, Taf, Verlag Walter de Gruyter, Berlin.
, 

27:
Meischner, J.
Das Porträt der theodosianischen Epoche, II (400 bis 460 n.Chr.). In: Jahrbuch des Deutschen Archäologischen Instituts, Band 106, 1991, 385-407, Taf. Verlag Walter de Gruyter, Berlin. , 

26:
Meischner, J.
Das Porträt der Galla Placidia im Museo dell'alto medioevo, Rom. In: Carl Deroux (Hrsg.): Latomus 1991, 861-864, Taf.

25:
Meischner, J.
Das Porträt der theodosianischen Epoche (380 bis 405 n.Chr.). In: Jahrbuch des Deutschen Archäologischen Instituts, Band 105, 1990, 303-324, Abb. Verlag Walter de Gruyter, Berlin. , 

24:
Meischner, J.
Ein theodosianisches Porträt, Études et Travaux 15, Zaklad Archeologii Srodziemnomorskiej Pan, Warschau 1990, 257-264, Abb. , 

23:
Meischner, J.
Zwei Gewichtbronzen in Form von Kaiserporträts, Römische Mitteilungen Band 96-1989, Verlag Philipp von Zabern, Mainz 1989, 407-418, Taf.. , 

22b:
Meischner, J.
Theodosianische Porträts. In: Ritratto Ufficiale e Ritratto Privato, Consiglio Nazionale delle Richerche, Rom 1988, 375-382 Abb.

22:
Meischner, J.
[Rez.zu]: Katalog der römischen Porträts in den Capitolinischen Museen und den anderen kommunalen Sammlungen der Stadt Rom, 1. Kaiser- und Prinzenbildnisse, Bonner Jahrbücher 1987, Band 187, Rheinland-Verlag, Köln 1987, 765-771.  

21:
Meischner, J.
[Rez.zu]: Katalog der romischen Porträts in den Capitolinischen Museen und den anderen kommunalen Sammlungen der Stadt Rom. 3. Kaiserinnen- und Prinzessinnenbildnisse, Frauenporträts, Bonner Jahrbücher 1986, Band 186, Rheinland-Verlag, Köln 1986, 804-809. 

20:
Meischner, J.
[Rez. zu]: Das Haus des Augustus auf dem Palatin. In: Gymnasium Band 93 1986, Carl Winter Universitätsverlag, Heidelberg 1986 232-233. 

19:
Meischner, J.
Die Porträtkunst der ersten und zweiten Tetrarchie bis zur Alleinherrschaft Konstantins, 293 bis 324 n.Chr. In: Archäologischer Anzeiger 1986,  223-250, Abb. Verlag Walter de Gruyter, Berlin. 

18:
Meischner, J.
Zu einem Männerbildnis in Boston. In: Archäologischer Anzeiger 1985, 135-140, Abb. Verlag Walter de Gruyter, Berlin. 

17:
Meischner, J.
Privatporträts aus den Regierungsjahren des Elagabal und Alexander Severus, 218 - 235. In: Jahrbuch des Deutschen Archäologischen Instituts 1984, 319-351, Abb. Verlag Walter de Gruyter, Berlin.  

16:
Meischner, J.
Eine spätantoninische Porträtgruppe. In: Archäologischer Anzeiger 1983, 607-610, Abb. Verlag Walter de Gruyter, Berlin. 

15:
Meischner, J.
Privatporträts der Jahre 195 bis 220 n. Chr. In: Jahrbuch des Deutschen Archäologischen Instituts, Band 97, 1982, 401-439, Abb. Verlag Walter de Gruyter, Berlin. , 

14:
Meischner, J.
Eine frühseverische Togabüste. In: Babesch 1982, Bulletin Antieke Beschaving, Verlag Orientaliste, Leuven 1982, 118-120, Taf. 

13:
Meischner, J.
[Rez.zu]: Ein Bildnis des Königs Antiochos IV. von Syrien.
Archäologischer Anzeiger  1982,  Verlag Walter de Gruyter, Berlin 1983, 637-638. 

12:
Meischner, J.
Bildnisse des Maximianus Herculius. Zum Kaiserkopf im Archäologischen Museum Mailand. In: Ermanno Arslan (Hrsg.): Notizie dal Chiostro dal monastero maggiore. Rassegna di studi del civico museo archeologico e del civico gabinetto numismatico Milano 1981, 37-46, Taf. Verlag Fratelli Azzimonti, S. Donato Milanese.

11:
Meischner, J.
Fragen zur römischen Porträtgeschichte unter besonderer Berücksichtigung kleinasiatischer Beispiele. Bonner Jahrbücher 1981, Rheinland-Verlag, Köln 1981, 143-167, Abb. 

10:
Meischner, J.
[Rez.zu]: M. Bergmann: Marc Aurel. In: Bömer, Voit (Hrsg.): Gymnasium Band 87 1980, S. 138ff. Carl Winter Universotätsverlag, Heidelberg. 

9:
Meischner, J.
Bonaventura Genelli: Centaurenfamilie. In: Vereniging Antieke Beschaving (Hrsg.): Bulletin Antieke Beschaving 1975, S. 273–274.

8:
Meischner, J.
Preiskrone und Preiszylinder. In: Jahrbuchn des Deutschen Archäologischen Instituts, Band 89, 1974, S. 336–346, Abb. Verlag Walter de Gruyter, Berlin 1975. Abb. 

7:
Meischner, J.
Beobachtungen zu einem bärtigen Reliefkopf in Pergamon. In: Istanbuler Mitteilungen Band 22, 1972, 113-132, Abb. Verlag Ernst Wasmuth, Tübingen 1973. 

6:
Meischner, J.
Der Diadumenian Woburn-Munchen. In: Archäologischer Anzeiger 1970, S. 241–247, Verlag Walter de Gruyter, Berlin. Abb. 

5:
Meischner, J.
Ein Pferdeamulett aus Bogazkoy. In: Jahrbuch des Archäologischen Instituts, Band 84, 1969,  S:179-188, Abb. Verlag Walter de Gruyter, Berlin.

4:
Meischner, J.
Ein Porträt des Kaisers Volusianus. In: Archäologischer Anzeiger 1967, Verlag Walter de Gruyter, Berlin 1967, 220-228, Abb. 

3:
Meischner, J.
Zwei Stilrichtungen der Porträtkunst des mittleren 3. Jahrhunderts nach Christus. Zum Bildnis des Maximinus Thrax. In: Archäologischer Anzeiger 1967, Verlag Walter de Gruyter, Berlin 1967, 34-46, Abb. 

2:
Meischner, J.
Das Frauenporträt der Severerzeit
Berlin : Philosophischen Fakultat der Freien Universitat Berlin, 1964.
Umfang 194 p., [29] p. of plates (1 folded) : ill.
Dissertation Zugl.: Berlin, Freie Universitat, Diss.,1966

1:
Meischner, J.
Zum Bildnis der Kaiserin Crispina. In: Jahrbuch des Deutschen Archäologischen Instituts und Archäologischer Anzeiger, Band 76, 1961, S. 188–192, Abb. Verlag Walter de Gruyter, Berlin 1962.

External links
 Kontaktdaten: Deutsches Archäologisches Institut 
 Rudolf H. W. Stichel, Gnomon, 77. Bd., H. 1 (2005), pp. 66–70 Published by: Verlag C.H.Beck. Rezension: Meischner, J.: Bildnisse der Spätantike 193-500. Problemfelder. Die Privatporträts 

1935 births
Living people
People from the Free City of Danzig
German archaeologists
Free University of Berlin alumni
German women archaeologists